William J. Henderson (born June 16, 1947) served as the United States Postmaster General from 1998 to 2001.

Education 
Henderson graduated with a degree in industrial relations from University of North Carolina at Chapel Hill.

Career 
Henderson served in the U.S. Army.

After many years of rising through the ranks of the United States Postal Service, Henderson was appointed as the United States Postmaster General by the Governors of the U.S. Postal Service, effective May 16, 1998. He was the fifth career employee to lead the world’s largest postal system. On May 31, 2001, Henderson's contract as the United States Postmaster General expired and he stepped down.

In January 2006, Henderson became the chief operations officer at Netflix.

Henderson is a director of LiveRamp. His total 2010 remuneration for this role was $100,000.

In 2011, Henderson founded Hold The Eye Images, Inc.

Awards 
 1997 John Wanamaker Award from USPS.
 1998 Roger W. Jones Award from American University.
 1998 Honorary Mailing Excellence Award from National Postal Forum.
 2000 elected as a fellow of the National Academy of Public Administration.

Personal life 
Henderson enjoys photography.

References

External links 

 Lawsuit of William Ray
 William J. Henderson's statement to U.S. House of Rep on April 2001
 Postal Service Changes Relocation Rules: Henderson announced the retirement of Porras
 William J. Henderson at equilar.com
 William J. Henderson at bloomberg.com
 End of Route
 William J. Henderson's Photography Blog on typepad.com

1947 births
United States Postmasters General
Living people
University of North Carolina at Chapel Hill alumni
Clinton administration personnel
George W. Bush administration personnel